Reza Ghasemi (born 24 July 1987 in Isfahan) is an Iranian sprinter. He represented his country at the 2012 Summer Olympics as well as two outdoor and three indoor World Championships.

International competitions

1Did not start in the semifinals

Personal bests
Outdoor
100 metres – 10.12 (+0.4 m/s, Almaty 2015)
200 metres – 20.68 (+0.4 m/s, Almaty 2015)
Indoor
60 metres – 6.58 (Sopot 2014

References

1987 births
Iranian male sprinters
Living people
Olympic athletes of Iran
Athletes (track and field) at the 2012 Summer Olympics
Athletes (track and field) at the 2016 Summer Olympics
World Athletics Championships athletes for Iran
Athletes (track and field) at the 2014 Asian Games
Sportspeople from Isfahan
Asian Games competitors for Iran
Islamic Solidarity Games competitors for Iran
21st-century Iranian people